Elmarie Fredericks  (born 11 August 1986) is a Namibian women's international footballer who plays as a forward. She is a member of the Namibia women's national football team. She was part of the team at the 2014 African Women's Championship. On club level she played for Okahandja Beauties in Namibia.

References

1986 births
Living people
Namibian women's footballers
Namibia women's international footballers
Place of birth missing (living people)
Women's association football forwards